A Small Misunderstanding Leads to Disaster is the debut EP of the Australian post-hardcore band The Valley.

Track listing 

"Pretty Words Kill Me"
"Sorry When You're Smiling"
"Luke Perry Killed My Ego"
"I Tied It In With Vision"
"These Hands Your Eyes"

Personnel

Simon French – Vocals
Pete Campbell – Guitars
Tom Muller – Guitars
Shaun Pretorious – Bass
Tim Glastonbury – Drums and Percussion
Produced by: Blair Simmons
Engineered and mixed by: Blair Simmons
Mastered by: Don Bartley
Additional Keyboards: Andy Sorenson

2006 debut EPs
The Valley (band) albums